Havas (also Romanized as Hawās) is a village in Fariman Rural District, in the Central District of Fariman County, Razavi Khorasan Province, Iran. At the 2006 census, its population was 434, in 96 families.

References 

Populated places in Fariman County